Beishan Town is a town in Changsha County, Changsha, Hunan Province, China. It administers 18 villages and three neighborhoods.

Divisions of Changsha County
Changsha County